Fred Leland Meyers (born August 8, 1983) is an American retired actor and paramedic. He is best known for his recurring role as  Tom Gribalski in the Disney Channel original series Even Stevens and the follow-up Disney Channel original movie The Even Stevens Movie.

Career

He also co-starred the 2001 film Suspended Animation and opposite Hilary Duff in the 2004 film Raise Your Voice. Meyers also guest starred in the television series 7th Heaven, The Handler and That's So Raven, as well as appearing in the 2005 film Dirty Deeds. His last professional acting role was in the 2007 film Hallowed Ground.

Personal life

Meyers was born in Fort Leavenworth, Kansas. He currently lives in Midland, Texas, and is retired from acting. He works as paramedic and is married with a stepdaughter.

Filmography

References

External links
 

1983 births
Living people
Male actors from Kansas
American male child actors
American male film actors
American male television actors
People from Fort Leavenworth, Kansas